Philadelphia Boys Choir & Chorale is a boys' choir and men's chorale based in Philadelphia, Pennsylvania, currently under the direction of Jeffrey R. Smith. They are known as "America's Ambassadors of Song" and are considered to be one of the best boys choirs in the world. They have performed in concert venues such as Carnegie Hall, the Sydney Opera House, the Kimmel Center, Notre Dame de Paris, King's College Cathedral, and Philadelphia's Academy of Music.

History 
After six years at the Frankford High School in North Philadelphia, Robert G. Hamilton took over the All Philadelphia Elementary School Boys Choir (founded in 1961 by Dr. Carlton Jones Lake) in the Fall of 1968. The All Philadelphia Elementary School Boys Choir Ensemble traveled to Montreal, Canada to sing at the 1967 World's Fair (EXPO '67) and traveled to England and Wales as the only integrated choir to sing at the international music festival in Llangollen, Wales in the summer of 1968 (see The Philadelphia Inquirer Today Magazine Section dated June 16, 1968 https://www.newspapers.com/newspage/182095224/). Hamilton took his original High School Choir to the Music Educator's National Convention in Atlantic City in March 1963, and by the summer of 1964 had organized a 30-day tour with 90 singers to Scandinavia as the "Ambassadors of Song."  In 1965 the choir sang at the Philadelphia Academy of Music, along with a men's chorus organized by Hamilton. By 1968 he was conducting the All Philadelphia Elementary School Boy's Choir, under the purview of the Board of Education (which consisted of approximately 250 boys from schools all over the city who had been gathering at Benjamin Franklin High School at Broad and Spring Garden Streets since being organized by Dr. Carlton Jones Lake in 1961), but moved to an independent group later that year.

Two years later, he added a Men's Chorale to expand available repertoire. He remained the artistic director for the choir's next 37 years.  In 1968 they launched the concert tour to Mexico, the first of many. The Choir has performed premieres of works under the batons of Maestros Eugene Ormandy, Riccardo Muti, Zubin Mehta, Klaus Tennstedt and Wolfgang Sawallisch in concert with the Philadelphia Orchestra.

Riccardo Muti hailed the boys as a "gem" at the performance of the concert version of Puccini's Tosca with internationally acclaimed soloists Carol Vaness, Giuseppe Giacomini, Giorgio Zancanaro and the Westminster Symphonic Choir. During a visit to the Soviet Embassy during the Cold War, the Soviet Embassy said "their voices are a treasure of art" and viewed them highly in bettering understanding between the Soviet Union and the United States.

Guest conductors Dennis Russell Davies and Charles Dutoit have conducted the Choir for performances of Mendelssohn's Midsummer Night's Dream  and the concert version of Puccini's La Bohème with the Philadelphia Orchestra. During the 1990s, the Choir added Benjamin Britten's War Requiem to its repertoire under the baton of Wolfgang Sawallisch, as well as the concert version of Carl Orff's Carmina Burana, conducted by Zdenek Macal in 1996 with the Choral Arts Society. They sang in 1992 at the Sydney Opera House to a sold out audience.

Each year, the Pennsylvania Ballet hosts the Choir as part of their seasonal favorite, The Nutcracker. Internationally, the Choir singers have performed for the Royal Families of Sweden, Denmark, England, Thailand and in over 30 countries around the world.

In 2008, the choir celebrated its anniversary with a concert at the Irvine Auditorium and a tour to Spain, a first for the choir. In 2009, the choir went to South America after a successful performance at Carnegie Hall in New York City. Over the years, the choir has become a household name in the Philadelphia area. They have also sung at the White House for four presidents. More recently, the choir sang for then-candidate Barack Obama in Germantown and Laura Bush at the Cityline Hotel in Philadelphia.

Major annual concerts
Philadelphia Boys Choir and Chorale performs two major annual concerts: the Winter and Spring concerts. The Winter concert consists of mostly Christmas music, pop songs, and traditional carols. The concert is  often performed in churches, theaters, and the occasional concert hall. The concert is performed with a select orchestra and is a family favorite for the entire Delaware Valley.

The spring concert has, for the past few years, been at the Kimmel Center in Philadelphia, and is often themed, so stage settings, choir fundraisers, and the music selections follow a central motif. The musical styles have ranged from full classical choral or orchestral works (such as Orff's Carmina Burana) to pop and other modern choral compositions. The Spring concert offers the most diversity of repertoire, and is often considered the more musically sophisticated of the two.

Concert venues have included the Kimmel Center in Philadelphia, Philadelphia's Academy of Music, Irvine Auditorium, and numerous venues with community and faith-based organizations in the Philadelphia Metro region. Over the years, the choir has been increasing its presence in New York with performances on Good Morning America and multiple concerts at Carnegie Hall.

Other important performances
The choir annually sings the national anthem at the Philadelphia Phillies Home Opener, and has done the same for the 1980 World Series, 1993 World Series and the 2008 NLCS, the 2009 NLCS, and the 2010 NLCS. The Philadelphia Boys Choir sings in the Pennsylvania Ballet's annual performance of "The Nutcracker" every winter at the Academy of Music. Starting in 2009, they have performed with Peter Nero and Lauren Kennedy with the Philly Pops at the Kimmel Center for the Performing Arts. They also sing during the Philadelphias Macy's historical light show during the Christmas season. The Philadelphia Orchestra also often recruits the choir and boys from it for necessary pieces.

Recordings
The Choir currently offers 1 album in CD Format, Celebrate the Sounds of the Season.

Past albums include:

Two Holiday CDs:
 Shimmering, Glimmering,
 and Holiday Enchantment,
along with one album of audience favorites,
 By Request,
one album of show-tunes.
 One Singular Sensation,
and one Complete Recording of a commissioned work
 Concert Mass.

Alumni 
Choir alumni include Joe Bonsall (Oak Ridge Boys), Shawn Stockman (Boyz II Men), Stephen Tirpak, Ukee Washington, Lawrence Zazzo, Pat Grossi (Active Child), Justin Hopkins (opera singer), Mena Mark Hanna (musicologist and founding dean of the Barenboim-Said Akademie), AUDELCO Award Winner James A. Pierce, III (Actor), Joshua Loper (The Grand and Delaware Military Academy), Leon Bates (concert pianist), and Academy Award Winner Benj Pasek. Boys in the choir have been asked to perform on Broadway on numerous occasions, and several alumni have secured roles.

Tours

References

External links 
 Philadelphia Boys Choir Official Site
 Choir's Performance Schedule

Choirs in Pennsylvania
Culture of Philadelphia
Musical groups established in 1968
Boys' and men's choirs
1968 establishments in Pennsylvania
Men in the United States